Archduchess Gregoria Maximiliana of Austria (22 May 1581 – 20 September 1597) was a member of the House of Habsburg.

She was the daughter of Archduke Charles II of Austria, the son of Emperor Ferdinand I, and Maria Anna of Bavaria. Her elder brother Archduke Ferdinand, succeeded as Holy Roman Emperor in 1619.

Life
Born in Graz, her godparents were Pope Gregory XIII and her maternal aunt, Maximiliana Maria of Bavaria. Named after both, Gregoria Maximiliana was described as extremely pious and had the closest relationship to her mother among her siblings.

In addition to the Habsburg inferior lip, Gregoria Maximiliana suffered from a deformed shoulder and a scarred face.

In 1596, the Admiral of Aragon arrived to Graz and had deliver to the Spanish court portraits of Gregoria Maximiliana and her two younger sisters in marriageable age, Eleanor and Margaret. Shortly after, Gregoria Maximiliana was betrothed to the Prince of Asturias, future King Philip III. Although the Prince, after seeing the portraits he preferred Margaret, his father King Philip II chose Gregoria Maximiliana as his bride, mainly because she was the older sister.

On 17 September 1597, the Prince of Asturias made a visit to the Imperial court in Graz. At this time, Gregoria Maximiliana was seriously ill and she compared her suffering to the prisoners of the Turkish sultan. Three days later, she died aged sixteen, and was in buried in Seckau Abbey. Gregoria Maximiliana's fiancé married her sister Margaret in 1599.

Ancestors

References

1581 births
1597 deaths
16th-century House of Habsburg
Austrian princesses
Daughters of monarchs
People from Graz